Chen Wei (born 14 February 1998) is a Chinese football player who plays as goalkeeper for Shanghai SIPG in Chinese Super League.

Club career
Chen Wei was promoted to Chinese Super League side Shanghai SIPG's first team squad by André Villas-Boas in 2017. On 27 September 2017, he made his professional debut in a 1–1 draw against Urawa Red Diamonds on semi-final round of the 2017 AFC Champions League.

Career statistics
.

Honours

Club
Shanghai SIPG
Chinese Super League: 2018
Chinese FA Super Cup: 2019

Individual
 Toulon Tournament Best Goalkeeper: 2019
Toulon Tournament Best XI: 2019

References

External links

1998 births
Living people
People from Jingdezhen
Chinese footballers
Chinese Super League players
Shanghai Port F.C. players
Association football goalkeepers
Footballers from Jiangxi
Footballers at the 2018 Asian Games
Asian Games competitors for China